Miri Davidovitz is an Israeli photographer.

Biography 
Miri Davidovitz was born in Europe. She immigrated in Israel as a child. After studying photography in Jerusalem and London she opened studio in Tel Aviv. She works as advertising and fashion photographer as well as independent photography teacher. She is mostly known for documenting an Israeli club culture of 80s and early 90s. In 2017 she created a project, depicting refugees from Africa and foreign workers in south Tel Aviv.

Exhibitions

Solo
 2015 Brake, Kuli Alma Gallery. Tel Aviv
 2015 Rock'N' Black, Eretz Israel Museum
 2013 Mamilla, Eretz Israel Museum
 2013 UnderCurrents, Artists House, Tel Aviv
 2011 After Rachel, Bina Gallery, Tel Aviv
 2010 80's Black & White, Rif Raf, Tel Aviv
 2008 The Beauty and the beast, Engel Gallery, Tel Aviv
 1983 The White Gallery, Tel Aviv

Group
Miri Davidovitz participated in group exhibitions around the world and in Israel, including exhibitions in Israel Museum in Jerusalem, Minshar School of Art Gallery in Tel Aviv, Herzlia Museum of Contemporary Art, Tel Aviv Museum of Art and several public and private galleries.

References

External links 
 Miri Davidovitz

Israeli photographers